Park Se-yeong (born 26 July 1993) is a South Korean short track speed skater.

His sisters are Park Seung-ju, a speed skater, and Park Seung-hi, a short track speed skater. In February 2014, all of them competed for the South Korea national team in the 2014 Winter Olympics.

External links
Profile from The-Sports.org

1993 births
Living people
South Korean male short track speed skaters
Olympic short track speed skaters of South Korea
Short track speed skaters at the 2014 Winter Olympics
Asian Games medalists in short track speed skating
Asian Games gold medalists for South Korea
Asian Games silver medalists for South Korea
Asian Games bronze medalists for South Korea
Short track speed skaters at the 2017 Asian Winter Games
Medalists at the 2017 Asian Winter Games
Universiade medalists in short track speed skating
World Short Track Speed Skating Championships medalists
Universiade gold medalists for South Korea
Competitors at the 2015 Winter Universiade
People from Suwon
Sportspeople from Gyeonggi Province
21st-century South Korean people